Myrmecia subfasciata is an ant which belongs to the genus Myrmecia. This species is native to Australia. Their distribution in Australia is not exactly known but a specimen was collected in Liverpool. It was described by Viehmeyer in 1924.

The average worker length is 21 millimetres long. The Myrmecia subfasciata has a very similar appearance to the Myrmecia gulosa and the Myrmecia pyriformis.

References

Myrmeciinae
Hymenoptera of Australia
Insects described in 1924
Insects of Australia